Byakov or Biakov is a Russian masculine surname, its feminine counterpart is Byakova or Biakova. It may refer to
Dmitry Byakov (born 1978), Kazakhstani football midfielder
Ivan Biakov (1944–2009), Soviet biathlete
Lyudmila Byakova (born 1946), Russian seamstress

Russian-language surnames